Century Hotel is a 2001 Canadian drama/mystery/romance film. It is directed and co-written by David Weaver and Bridget Newson.

The film explains seven different stories, that happen in the same hotel room in different eras, from the 1920s to the 1990s. The stories are not told one after the other, but interspersed.

Cast

External links 
 

2001 films
English-language Canadian films
Canadian mystery films
2001 romantic drama films
2000s mystery films
Films set in the 1920s
Films set in the 1930s
Films set in the 1940s
Films set in the 1950s
Films set in the 1960s
Films set in the 1980s
Films set in the 1990s
2000s English-language films
2000s Canadian films